Westley Sissel Unseld Jr. (born September 20, 1975) is an American professional basketball coach who is the head coach for the Washington Wizards of the National Basketball Association (NBA). He is the son of Basketball Hall of Fame player, coach, and executive Wes Unseld.

Early life and education
Unseld was born on September 20, 1975, and grew up in Catonsville, Maryland. At a young age, he developed a close attachment to basketball; his father is Basketball Hall of Fame member Wes Unseld. From the age of five, he was in locker rooms with his father before games, and after drove home with him. As an adult, he remembers "a great family atmosphere in the locker room". He played high school basketball as a center at Loyola Blakefield in Towson, Maryland. His skill set as a center did not carry over to the backcourt, as he continued on with college basketball for four years at Johns Hopkins University, graduating in 1997.

Coaching career

Washington Wizards (2005–2011) 
Unseld went directly from college to the NBA, starting as a personnel scout for the Washington Wizards, working for his father who was general manager. He had planned to go to graduate school after graduation but decided to give basketball one year to see if he would enjoy it. In his ninth year, after eight years of personnel and advance scouting, he was promoted to assistant coach. Unseld has been given credit for creating Washington's offensive game plan, which led to three consecutive  top-ten offensive seasons from 2004 to 2007. He also worked as a scout and assistant coach for the Washington Mystics of the WNBA.

Golden State Warriors (2011–2012) 
In 2011, Unseld Jr. left the Wizards for the Golden State Warriors after being denied a position as a front row bench coach.

Orlando Magic (2012–2015) 
After one season with the Warriors, Unseld went to the Orlando Magic as an assistant coach in 2012. After a 15–37 start to the 2014–2015 season Unseld was fired, along with coach Jacque Vaughn, in February, 2015.

Denver Nuggets (2015–2021) 
When his lifelong friend, Tim Connelly, became general manager of the Denver Nuggets in 2015, he offered Unseld a job as an assistant coach. In 2016 he was made lead assistant coach. His special assignment had been to manage a defense that had been poor; the Nuggets went from 28th in defense in 2017–18 to 10th in the 2018–19 season. He has been credited with the development of Nikola Jokić, Jamal Murray, and Michael Porter Jr. In 2019, he interviewed for the vacant Cleveland Cavaliers head coaching job, but did not get the job. From 2018 until 2021, Denver ranked among the top six in defensive efficiency.

Return to the Wizards (2021–present) 
Unseld Jr. signed a four-year contract to become the head coach of the Washington Wizards on July 17, 2021.

Personal life 

Unseld is married with two children. The family resides in Potomac, Maryland.

Head coaching record

|-
| align="left" |Washington
| align="left" |
|82||35||47|||| align="center" |4th in Southeast||—||—||—||—|| align="center"|Missed playoffs
|-class="sortbottom"
| align="center" colspan="2"|Career
|82||35||47|||| ||—||—||—||||align="center"|—

References

1975 births
Living people
African-American basketball coaches
American men's basketball coaches
Basketball coaches from Maryland
Basketball players from Maryland
Denver Nuggets assistant coaches
Golden State Warriors assistant coaches
Johns Hopkins Blue Jays men's basketball players
Loyola Blakefield alumni
Orlando Magic assistant coaches
People from Catonsville, Maryland
People from Towson, Maryland
Sportspeople from Baltimore County, Maryland
Washington Wizards assistant coaches
Washington Wizards head coaches